The Samsung Galaxy Z series (named as Samsung Galaxy Foldables in certain territories) is a line of foldable smartphones manufactured by Samsung Electronics.

With the 2020 announcement of the Galaxy Z Flip, Samsung's future foldable smartphones will be part of the Galaxy Z series.

Prototype foldable phone 
In 2018, Samsung announced the Samsung Galaxy X prototype before manufacture and release of the foldable under the new name Samsung Galaxy Z Series in 2019.

Phones

Samsung Galaxy Fold 

The Samsung Galaxy Fold was the first phone in the Galaxy Z series, and the only one not marketed under the "Z" brand. It was announced on February 20, 2019 and released on September 6, 2019, in South Korea. A version of the device marketed as the Samsung W20 5G was released on December 12 exclusively for China Telecom, with a faster Snapdragon 855+ processor and a unique white finish.

Samsung Galaxy Z Flip 

The Samsung Galaxy Z Flip and Z Flip 5G were released on 14 February 2020 and 7 August 2020 respectively, and was the first device to be marketed under the "Z" brand. Unlike the Galaxy Fold, the device folds vertically and uses a hybrid glass coating branded as "Infinity Flex Display".

Samsung Galaxy Z Fold 2 

The Samsung Galaxy Z Fold 2 5G was released on 18 September 2020, and is the second generation of Samsung's outward fold design introduced with the original Fold. It features a significantly larger front screen than its predecessor, a high refresh rate 120 Hz folding screen, minimal bezels and improved cameras. A luxury model called the Samsung W21 5G was unveiled in November 2020 exclusively for the Chinese market.

Samsung Galaxy Z Fold 3 and Z Flip 3 

Samsung unveiled its third generation of folding phones, the Galaxy Z Fold 3 5G and Galaxy Z Flip 3 5G on 11 August 2021.

Both the Z Fold 3 and Z Flip 3 have more durable materials, a redesigned hinge, and IPX8 water resistance.

Samsung Galaxy Z Fold 4 and Z Flip 4 

The Samsung Galaxy Z Fold 4 (stylized as Samsung Galaxy Z Fold4) is a foldable smartphone that is part of the Samsung Galaxy Z series. It was announced at the August 2022 edition of Galaxy Unpacked alongside the Galaxy Z Flip 4 with a release either later in the month or in early September. It is the successor to the Galaxy Z Fold 3.

The Samsung Galaxy Z Flip 4 (stylized as Samsung Galaxy Z Flip4) is a foldable smartphone that is part of the Samsung Galaxy Z series. This device was announced in August 2022, with a release either later in the month or in early September.

Rebranding in Europe 
In March 2022, Samsung began to quietly rebrand the current Galaxy Fold and Flip devices in the Baltic states (Estonia, Latvia, and Lithuania) to remove the "Z" branding from their names. This is for sensitivity reasons due to the 2022 Russian invasion of Ukraine, as the letter "Z" has been used as a symbol by the Russian military and as a pro-war symbol by Russian citizens.

References 

Galaxy Z Series
Galaxy Z Series
Android (operating system) devices
Samsung mobile series
Foldable smartphones